The 1971 European Ladies' Team Championship took place 30 June – 3 July at Ganton Golf Club, in Ganton, North Yorkshire, England. It was the seventh women's golf amateur European Ladies' Team Championship.

Venue 

The hosting club was founded in 1891 and the course was initially designed by Tom Chisholm and Robert Bird, later modified by different course architects, including James Braid, Alister MacKenzie, Harry Colt, John Henry Taylor, and Harry Vardon. It previously hosted the 1949 Ryder Cup and the 1964 Amateur Championship.

The course was set up with par 75 over 6,289 yards, with 38 on the front nine holes and 37 on the back nine.

There was heavy rain the days before the tournament and warm weather with a small breeze during the competition.

Format 
All participating teams played one qualification round of stroke-play with up to five players, counted the four best scores for each team.

The eight best teams formed flight A, in knock-out match-play over the next three days. The teams were seeded based on their positions after the stroke play. Each of the four best placed teams were drawn to play the quarter final against one of the teams in the flight placed in the next four positions. In each match between two nation teams, two 18-hole foursome games and five 18-hole single games were played. Teams were allowed to switch players during the team matches, selecting other players in to the afternoon single matches after the morning foursome matches. Games all square after 18 holes were declared halved, if the team match was already decided.

The six teams placed 9–14 in the qualification stroke-play formed Flight B, to play similar knock-out play to decide their final positions.

Teams 
14 nation teams contested the event. Each team consisted of a minimum of four players.

Winners 
Tied leaders of the opening 18-hole competition were the finalist teams from the previous championship two years earlier, host nation England and defending champions France, each with an 18-over-par score of 318. Host nation England earned first place on the tie breaking better non-counting score.

Individual leader in the opening 18-hole stroke-play qualifying competition was Marion Petersen, Germany, with a score of 1-over-par 76, one stroke ahead of Julia Greenhalgh, England. Six players in the field broke 80. There was no official award for the lowest individual score.

Team England won the championship, earning their third title, beating defending champions France in the final 5–2. With the win, England became the first nation to win the men's and the women's European amateur team championships in the same year. England came to repeat that achievement the following year.

Team Sweden, for the second time on the podium, beat the Netherlands 5–2 in the third place match.

Results 
Qualification round

Team standings

* Note: In the event of a tie the order was determined by the better non-counting score.

Individual leaders

 Note: There was no official award for the lowest individual score.

Flight A

Bracket

Final games

Flight B

Bracket

Final standings
 
Sources:

See also 
 Espirito Santo Trophy – biennial world amateur team golf championship for women organized by the International Golf Federation.
 European Amateur Team Championship – European amateur team golf championship for men organised by the European Golf Association.

References

External links 
 European Golf Association: Results

European Ladies' Team Championship
Golf tournaments in England
European Ladies' Team Championship
European Ladies' Team Championship
European Ladies' Team Championship